1976 earthquake may refer to:

Earthquake geological events
1976 Bali earthquake
1976 Çaldıran–Muradiye earthquake (Turkey)
1976 Friuli earthquake (Italy)
1976 Guatemala earthquake
1976 Moro Gulf earthquake (Philippines) (great, tsunami)
1976 Papua earthquake (Indonesia)
1976 Songpan–Pingwu earthquake (China)
1976 Tangshan earthquake (China) (great), also known as the "Great Tangshan earthquake"

Sports
1976 San Jose Earthquakes season, a year involved for the professional soccer club San Jose Earthquakes (1974–88)